Carl Ludvig Gerlach   (April 26, 1832 – September 13, 1893) was a Danish composer and opera singer.

Notable works
Kjærlighed er trolddom (1856)
3 Charakteerstykker (1859)
Fader vor (1862)
Jesus opvækker Lazarus (1870)
Kejserfesten paa Kreml (1875)
Sang til Lygtemænd (1875)
Meza 
Forbandet Kain udi ørken gik

See also
List of Danish composers

References
This article was initially translated from Carl Ludvig Gerlach on the Danish Wikipedia which lists the following sources:
Dansk biografisk Leksikon 
Dansk biografisk Håndleksikon

External links
 

1832 births
1893 deaths
Male composers
19th-century Danish male opera singers
19th-century Danish composers
Danish people of German descent
Singers from Copenhagen